The 2010 Cornell Big Red football team was an American football team that represented Cornell University in the 2010 NCAA Division I FCS football season. They were led by first-year head coach Kent Austin and played their home games at Schoellkopf Field. Cornell finished the season 2–8 overall and 1–6 in Ivy League play to place seventh. Cornel averaged 6,877 fans per gam.

Schedule

References

Cornell
Cornell Big Red football seasons
Cornell Big Red football